Wang Chuqi (born 6 February 1999) is a Chinese footballer who plays for Kunshan.

Club career
Wang played for now-defunct Chinese Super League side Jiangsu Suning, where he stayed until his extended contract expired after the 2020 season. He later complained that the Jiansu-based club still owed him wages from previous seasons.

In 2021, Wang rejoined Kunshan, the club he had spent the 2019 season with on loan.

Career statistics

Club

References

1999 births
Living people
Chinese footballers
Chinese expatriate footballers
Association football forwards
China League Two players
Atlético Madrid footballers
Jiangsu F.C. players
Kunshan F.C. players
Chinese expatriate sportspeople in Spain
Expatriate footballers in Spain